Tudhaliya I (sometimes Tudhaliya II or Tudhaliya I/II) was a king of the Hittite Empire (New Kingdom) in c. the early 14th century BC.

Identity 
Proper numbering of the Hittite rulers who bore the name Tudhaliya is problematic. There was a Hattian era figure who bore the name Tudhaliya who may or may not have ruled as king. Other reconstructions insert a Tudhaliya directly after Muwatalli I, but before the Tudhaliya discussed here.

Some scholars call Tudhaliya I the first king of the New Kingdom, or Empire. Others give this honor to Suppiluliuma I.  Tudhaliya may have been the grandson of the Middle Kingdom ruler Huzziya II. He may have been the direct successor of Muwatalli I, having overthrown him. The exact sequence of succession at the beginning of the New Kingdom is uncertain, however, because of the difficulty of placing Hattusili II. Tudhaliya I's reign includes a period of co-regency with Arnuwanda I, his son-in-law and adopted son.

Biography 
The most famous event of Tudhaliya's reign was his conquest of the land Assuwa. Assuwa's name is believed by some scholars to be the origin of the modern place name Asia, although this is not beyond dispute.  Further, there were many component territories within Assuwa, including the lands Taruisa and Wilusiya, which are now generally accepted to be references to Troy/Ilios, although there is not enough evidence at this time to explain how these two lands came to apply to a single location.

Family 
Tudhaliya's wife was Nikal-mati. He had a daughter Ašmu-nikal who married Arnuwanda.

In the Bible 
A number of modern biblical scholars believe that either Tudhaliya I, or the proto-Hittite Tudhaliya, was the same individual as Tidal, king of Nations, who is mentioned in the Book of Genesis as having joined Chedorlaomer in attacking rebels in Canaan.

Notes

External links
Reign of Tudhaliya I (listed as Tudhaliya II at this link)

Hittite kings
14th-century BC people